Banjengan is a village in the town of Mandiraja, Banjarnegara Regency, Central Java Province, Indonesia. This villages has an area of 124.68 hectares and a population of 2,120 inhabitants in 2010.

References

External links
 Banjarnegara Regency Official Website
 BPS Kabupaten Banjarnegara

Banjarnegara Regency
Villages in Central Java